Zaliznýčnyj District is an urban district of the city of Lviv, named after the Lviv railway station (залізниця, zaliznytsia means railway). This district covers western part of the city. It contains such neighborhoods as Bilohorshcha, Levandivka and Sknylivok. Lviv International Airport is situated also in this district.

Name
Zaliznychny district together with Shevchenkivskyi is one of the two districts name of which have not been changed since Soviet times. Apparently, it is name connected to the fact that the area is open around the railway - on its territory is the main railway station, as well as a number of small states. In addition, it is mostly in Levandivka, where the workers of the Lviv Railway traditionally live.

References

See also
Subdivisions of Ukraine

Urban districts of Lviv